The American singer Emmylou Harris has released 26 studio albums (including four albums of collaborations with other artists), four live albums, 11 compilation albums, three video albums, and 70 singles. After releasing a debut folk album on the Jubilee label in 1969 and recording with Gram Parsons, Harris signed with Reprise Records in 1974.

In 1975, Harris released her major-label debut album, Pieces of the Sky, on Reprise. The second single, "If I Could Only Win Your Love," reached number 4 on the Billboard Hot Country Singles chart, and the album was certified gold in the United States. The success of the album led to Harris's second album released that year, Elite Hotel, which topped the Billboard Top Country Albums chart and spawned three singles. In 1977 and 1978, she released her fourth and fifth studio albums, Luxury Liner and Quarter Moon in a Ten Cent Town, both of which were certified gold.

Her sixth studio album, Blue Kentucky Girl, was released in 1979. She followed it with a bluegrass-influenced album, Roses in the Snow, In 1980; it debuted at number 2 on the Top Country Albums list and number 26 on the Billboard 200. That album also went gold, as did her eighth studio album, Evangeline (1981).  She released a live album, Last Date in 1982. Her next album, White Shoes, was released in 1983; it debuted at number 22 on the country album chart and number 116 on the pop album chart. She released the concept album The Ballad of Sally Rose in 1985, consisting of songs she wrote or co-wrote.

The album Trio, for which Harris collaborated with Dolly Parton and Linda Ronstadt, was released in 1987. It was Harris's highest-selling album, attaining platinum status in the United States and contained four Top 10 singles, including the number-one "To Know Him Is to Love Him". The three released a second collaborative album, Trio II, in 1999. Harris released another solo album in 1990. She subsequently signed with Elektra Records and released the live album At the Ryman in 1992, followed by the studio album Cowgirl's Prayer in 1993.

The atmospheric Wrecking Ball, released to critical acclaim in September 1995, established Harris's reputation as an alternative country artist. The album, produced by Daniel Lanois, debuted at number 96 on the Billboard 200 chart. Harris won a Grammy for it, in the category Best Contemporary Folk Recording. It was followed by a third live album, Spyboy, in 1998, and a collaborative album with Linda Ronstadt, Western Wall: The Tucson Sessions, in 1999. Harris returned as a solo artist in 2000 with her 18th studio album, Red Dirt Girl, which consists almost entirely of songs she wrote, followed by the similarly original Stumble into Grace in 2003. Her song for the soundtrack of the 2005 movie Brokeback Mountain, entitled "A Love That Will Never Grow Old", was not released as a single but won a Golden Globe Award among other honors and accolades. She and Mark Knopfler collaborated on the studio album All the Roadrunning, which debuted at number 17 on the Billboard 200 when it was released in April 2006. In June 2008, Harris released her 25th studio recording, All I Intended to Be. In April 2011 she released Hard Bargain, a simple production with just Harris, her producer Jay Joyce, and Giles Reaves playing all the instruments; it debuted at number three on the Billboard Top Country Albums and number 18 on the Billboard 200, one of her most successful albums on the  charts.

Harris has sold 4 million records in the United States, according to the Recording Industry Association of America.

Studio albums

1960s and 1970s

1980s

1990s

2000s and 2010s

Collaborations

Live albums

Christmas albums

Soundtrack albums

Compilation albums

Singles

1960s and 1970s

1980s

1990s — 2010s

Other singles

Collaborations

Guest singles

Christmas singles

Charted B-sides

Video albums

Music videos

Other appearances

Notes

References

External links 

 Emmylou Harris's Official Website
 

Country music discographies
Discographies of American artists
Folk music discographies